John Churchman House is a historic home located at Calvert, Cecil County, Maryland, United States. It consists of two distinct sections: a two-story, three-bay, gable-roofed brick house laid in Flemish bond dated to 1745; and a two-story, two-bay, gable-roofed house built in 1785 of uncoursed fieldstone. It was home to several generations of the locally prominent Churchman family, a number of whose members were important in the religious and educational history of Maryland-Pennsylvania Quakers in the 18th century.

The John Churchman House was listed on the National Register of Historic Places in 1986.

References

External links
, including undated photo, at Maryland Historical Trust

Quakerism in Maryland
Houses on the National Register of Historic Places in Maryland
Houses in Cecil County, Maryland
Houses completed in 1745
National Register of Historic Places in Cecil County, Maryland
1745 establishments in Maryland